Freedom of thought (also called  freedom of conscience) is the freedom of an individual to hold or consider a fact, viewpoint, or thought, independent of others' viewpoints.

Overview 

Every person attempts to have a cognitive proficiency by developing knowledge, concepts, theories and assessing them in the given environment. This cognitive proficiency gives a sense of contentment and replaces the feeling of helplessness. Apart from bringing ease to the ego of a person, new knowledge and ideas also bring a hope for the future.

Freedom of thought is the precursor and progenitor of—and thus is closely linked to—other liberties, including freedom of religion, freedom of speech, and freedom of expression. Though freedom of thought is axiomatic for many other freedoms, they are in no way required for it to operate and exist. The conception of a freedom or a right does not guarantee its inclusion, legality, or protection via a philosophical caveat. It is a very important concept in the Western world and nearly all democratic constitutions protect these freedoms.

For instance, the United States Bill of Rights contains the famous guarantee in the First Amendment that laws may not be made that interfere with religion "or prohibiting the free exercise thereof". U.S. Supreme Court Justice Benjamin Cardozo reasoned in Palko v. Connecticut (1937):

Such ideas are also a vital part of international human rights law. In the Universal Declaration of Human Rights (UDHR), which is legally binding on member states of the International Covenant on Civil and Political Rights (ICCPR), "freedom of thought" is listed under Article 18:

The United Nations' Human Rights Committee states that this, "distinguishes the freedom of thought, conscience, religion or belief from the freedom to manifest religion or belief. It does not permit any limitations whatsoever on the freedom of thought and conscience or on the freedom to have or adopt a religion or belief of one's choice. These freedoms are protected unconditionally". Similarly, Article 19 of the UDHR guarantees that "Everyone has the right to freedom of opinion and expression; this right includes freedom to hold opinions without interference".

History of development and suppression
It is impossible to know with certainty what another person is thinking, making suppression difficult. The concept is developed throughout the Bible, most fully in the writings of Saul of Tarsus (e.g., "For why should my freedom [eleutheria] be judged by another's conscience [suneideseos]?" 1 Corinthians 10:29).

Although Greek philosophers Plato and Socrates had discussed freedom of thought minimally, the edicts of King Ashoka (3rd century BC) have been called the first decree respecting freedom of conscience. In European tradition, aside from the decree of religious toleration by Constantine I at Milan in 313, the philosophers Themistius, Michel de Montaigne, Baruch Spinoza, John Locke, Voltaire, Alexandre Vinet, and John Stuart Mill and the theologians Roger Williams and Samuel Rutherford have been considered major proponents of the idea of freedom of conscience (or "soul liberty" in the words of Williams).

Queen Elizabeth I revoked a thought censorship law in the late sixteenth century, because, according to Sir Francis Bacon, she did "not [like] to make windows into men's souls and secret thoughts". During her reign, philosopher, mathematician, astrologer, and astronomer Giordano Bruno took refuge in England from the Italian Inquisition, where he published a number of his books regarding an infinite universe and topics banned by the Catholic Church. After , Bruno was eventually burned as a heretic in Rome for refusing to recant his ideas. For this reason, he is considered by some to be a martyr for free thought.

Oliver Cromwell is described by Ignaz von Döllinger as "the first among the mighty men of the world to set up one special religious principle, and to enforce it so far as in him lay: ... The principle of liberty of conscience and the repudiation of religious coercion".

However, freedom of expression can be limited through censorship, arrests, book burning, or propaganda, and this tends to discourage freedom of thought. Examples of effective campaigns against freedom of expression are the Soviet suppression of genetics research in favor of a theory known as Lysenkoism, the book-burning campaigns of Nazi Germany, the radical anti-intellectualism enforced in Cambodia under Pol Pot and in Nazi Germany under Adolf Hitler, the strict limits on freedom of expression imposed by the Communist governments of the People's Republic of China and Cuba or by dictatorships such as those of Augusto Pinochet in Chile and Francisco Franco in Spain.

The Sapir–Whorf hypothesis, which states that thought can be embedded in language, would support the claim that an effort to limit the use of words of language is actually a form of restricting freedom of thought. This was explored in George Orwell's novel 1984, with the idea of Newspeak, a stripped-down form of the English language alleged to lack the capacity for metaphor and limiting expression of original ideas.

More recently, the development of neuroimaging technologies have raised concerns about entities being able to read and subsequently suppress thought.  Although the issue is complicated by the mind-body problem, these concerns form the emerging field of neuroethics and neuroprivacy.

See also

 Attention theft
 Freethought
 Cognitive liberty
 Conscientious objector
 Four Freedoms, Franklin Roosevelt's speech
 Free speech zone
 Free will
 Intellectual freedom
 Neuroethics
 State of World Liberty Index
 Public opinion
 Hate crime
 Hate speech
 Mind control
 Prisoner of conscience
 Thoughtcrime
 Victimless crime

References

Further reading
 D.V. Coornhert, Synod on the Freedom of Conscience: A Thorough Examination during the Gathering Held in the Year 1582 in the City of Freetown English translation
 Richard Joseph Cooke, Freedom of thought in religious teaching (1913)
 Lucas Swaine, "Freedom of Thought as a Basic Liberty," Political Theory, 46:3 (2018): 405–425. 
 Eugene J. Cooper, "Man's Basic Freedom and Freedom of Conscience in the Bible : Reflections on 1 Corinthians 8–10", Irish Theological Quarterly Dec 1975
 George Botterill and Peter Carruthers, 'The Philosophy of Psychology', Cambridge University Press (1999), p. 3
 The Hon. Sir John Laws, 'The Limitations of Human Rights', [1998] P. L. Summer, Sweet & Maxwell and Contributors, p. 260
 
 Roger Williams, The Bloudy Tenent of Persecution for Cause of Conscience (1644; 1867 reprint)
 Samuel Rutherford, Lex, Rex (1644)

External links

 The Bloody Tenent of Persecution (1867 reprint) (accessed July 10, 2009, on Google Books)
 Dictionary of the History of Ideas: Academic Freedom
 The Center for Cognitive Liberty & Ethics – a network of scholars elaborating the law, policy and ethics of freedom of thought
 John Bagnell Bury (1861–1927) A History of Freedom of Thought

Political terminology
Linguistic controversies
Human rights by issue
Censorship
Thought